Heber City is a city and county seat of Wasatch County, Utah. The population was 16,856 as of the 2020 United States census. The city is located 43 miles southeast of Salt Lake City.

History
Heber City was first settled in 1859 by Robert Broadhead, James Davis, and James Gurr. John W. Witt built the first house in the area. The area was under the direction of Bishop Silas Smith, who was in Provo. In 1860, Joseph S. Murdock became the bishop over the The Church of Jesus Christ of Latter-day Saints in Heber City and vicinity.

On May 5, 1899, the Wasatch Wave published this on the 40-year anniversary of Heber, "Forty years ago this week [April 30, 1859], this valley was first settled by a company of enterprising citizens from Provo. This company consisted of John Crook, James Carlile, Jessie Bond, Henry Chatwin, Charles N. Carroll, Thomas Rasband, John Jordan, John Carlile, Wm Giles and Mr. Carpenter, the last five named persons having since died. Forty years ago today, John Crook and Thomas Rasband commenced their first plowing in the beautiful little valley of the Timpanogos. A wonderful change has taken place of the appearance of the valley since that time. Delightful meadows and fields of waving grain have taken the place of sage brush and willows. Beautiful homes have erected where then was heard only the dismal howl of the coyote."

Geography
Heber City is located at  (40.506793, -111.412292), at an elevation of 5595 feet. The region in which Heber City is located is known as the Wasatch Back.

According to the United States Census Bureau, the city has a total area of 3.5 square miles (8.9 km2), all land.

Heber City is located near three large reservoirs, Jordanelle, Deer Creek, and Strawberry.

Climate
Large seasonal temperature differences typify this climatic region, with warm to hot (and often humid) summers and cold (sometimes severely cold) winters.  According to the Köppen Climate Classification system, Heber City has a humid continental climate, abbreviated "Dfb" on climate maps.

The data in the chart below are from the period 1893 - 2013 (Western Regional Climate Center).

Demographics

As of the census of 2010, there were 11,362 people and 3,637 households residing in the city. The population density was 2,113.5 people per square mile (/km2). There were 3,637 housing units at an average density of 710.5 per square mile (/km2). The racial makeup of the city was 87.7% White, 0.4% African American, 0.8% Native American, 1.1% Asian, 0.1% Pacific Islander. Hispanic or Latino of any race were 18.4% of the population.

There were 3,362 households, out of which 50.2% had children under the age of 18 living with them, 66% were married couples living together, 9.4% had a female householder with no husband present, and 20.6% were non-families. Of all households, 15.9% were individuals, and 6.4% had someone living alone who was 65 years or older. The average household size was 3.35, and the average family size was 3.78. The median age was 28.5 years.

The median income for a household in the city was $45,394, and the median income for a family was $47,481. Males had a median income of $33,816 versus $21,524 for females. The per capita income was $17,358. About 4.8% of families and 6.1% of the population were below the poverty line, including 6.7% of those under age 18 and 1.9% of those age 65 or older.

Economy
Heber City has one of the lowest unemployment rates in Utah. Local developers and business leaders cite that there are not enough jobs in the city itself (as 27% of residents commute to Park City or Salt Lake City for work) and wish to improve the city's self-reliance. Average home prices in the valley doubled from 2002–2008, and the population has grown by 25% in that same time period.

Tourism is a year-round industry in the Heber Valley. The winter season features cross-country and downhill skiing, snowboarding, and snowmobiling on several trails and the nearby ski resorts of Park City. In the summer and fall, golfing, off-roading, hunting, fishing,  and other outdoor recreational activities are abundant. Heber is also home to the Heber Valley Historic Railroad (HVRR), which was known as the Heber Creeper before 1989.

Heber City's youth are employed largely in the surrounding golf courses, restaurants, and specialty shops in Heber City and the surrounding area. Local contractors and farmers are also a major source of employment for the youth. The adult population work mostly in Park City, Salt Lake City, Provo, and Orem. Skiing and Snowboarding are very popular among Heber City's youth, and many people go to Park City mountain resort, Canyons, or Deer Valley, all of which are in Park City. Farming and ranching are a large economic force, but this has diminished slightly. The largest local employer is the Wasatch County School District.

Education
Within the city limits are Heber Valley, Old Mill, Daniels Canyon, and J.R. Smith Elementary Schools, Timpanogos Middle School, Rocky Mountain Middle School, Wasatch High School, and Wasatch Alternative High School.  An additional school in the Heber Valley is Midway Elementary School.  All of these schools are part of the Wasatch County School District.

Utah Valley University maintains a satellite campus just north of Heber City along the US-40 corridor.

Transportation
U.S. Route 40 and U.S. Route 189 both cross the city. Interstate 80 is located approximately eighteen miles north of the city and can be accessed via Highway 40, while Interstate 15 can be accessed via Highway 189 through Provo Canyon and is approximately twenty-five miles away. A typical drive to downtown Salt Lake City is 45 to 60 minutes.

Heber City was connected to Provo by a  railroad line. The line, completed in 1899, was used by Denver & Rio Grande Western until 1967. Today, a portion of the line is used by the famous Heber Valley Railroad, a heritage railroad open to the public.

The Heber City Municipal Airport, or Russ McDonald Field, FAA identifier HCR,  is located two miles south of the city, near the junction of U.S. Route 40 and U.S. Route 189, and is capable of handling aircraft up to large corporate jets, including Gulfstreams and Global Express. Approximately 85 aircraft are based at the airport. The airport is served by a GPS instrument approach procedure, allowing aircraft to arrive at the airport in adverse weather. During the winter ski season, and particularly the Sundance Film Festival, the airport is crowded with corporate jets as it is the closest airport to Park City. The airport is also home to the Heber Valley Airshow, held each summer. The nearest airport with commercial airline service is Salt Lake City International Airport.

Publicly funded transportation is being discussed but has not yet reached the implementation stage. Currently the only form of public transportation are two round-trips operated by Salt Lake Express on its Vernal - Salt Lake City route.

Notable people
 Tyson Apostol (born 1979), winner of Survivor: Blood vs. Water
 J. Reuben Clark (1871–1961), attorney, author, LDS apostle
 Ernie Lively (1947–2021), actor and father of actress Blake Lively and actor Eric Lively, as well as a stepfather of actor Jason Lively and actresses Lori Lively and Robyn Lively
 Jason Lively (born 1968), actor and entrepreneur
 Cael Sanderson (born 1979), only four-time undefeated collegiate wrestling champion in NCAA Division I history; 2004 Olympic Gold medalist in freestyle wrestling
 Sofía Gómez Villafañe (born 1994), cross-country mountain biker and cyclo-cross cyclist

See also

 List of cities and towns in Utah
 Heber, Utah micropolitan area

References

External links

 
 Wasatch County School District Public Schools

 
1859 establishments in Utah Territory
Cities in Utah
Cities in Wasatch County, Utah
County seats in Utah
Micropolitan areas of Utah
Populated places established in 1859